Inipit is a Filipino flat pastry made of flour, milk, lard, and sugar that have various filling sandwiched in between two sheets of the pastry. The name inipit means "pressed in between" or "sandwiched" in Tagalog.

Originally, the filling consists of a sweetened mashed potato mixture but other fillings especially custard, buttercream, and ube have become more common in the modern times. The towns of Guiguinto and Malolos in Bulacan are well known for their inipit. Philippine snack brand Lemon Square, which is based in Meycauayan, Bulacan, is also known for the first mass-produced Inipit.

Gallery

See also
 Ube cheesecake
 List of pastries

References

Philippine pastries
Culture of Bulacan